Goathill Quarry is a 0.3 hectare geological Site of Special Scientific Interest near Goathill in Dorset, England, notified in 1977.

References

External links
 English Nature website (SSSI information)

Sites of Special Scientific Interest in Dorset
Sites of Special Scientific Interest notified in 1977
Geology of Dorset
Quarries in Dorset